Qermezi Qeshlaq (also Romanized as Qermezī Qeshlāq; also known as Qezel Qeshlāq) is a village in Koshksaray Rural District, in the Central District of Marand County, East Azerbaijan Province, Iran. At the 2006 census, its population was 660, in 163 families.

References 

Populated places in Marand County